Ogoy ( from  - waterless) is the largest island in the Maloe More strait of Lake Baikal. It is located between the Cape Shara-Shulun on the west coast of the Olkhon Island and Kurminskiy Bay on the western shore of Lake Baikal. The island is uninhabited.

Wildlife and vegetation
Vegetation on the island is scarce, mainly grasses and low-growing shrubs, with a few larches in the wide central region. Wildlife includes ground squirrels, pikas, and snakes. The island is also a nesting ground for larks and herring gulls.

Places of interest
In 2005, at the highest point of the island, the Buddhist Stupa of Enlightenment dedicated to Dakini Tröma Nagmo was built at the initiative of the Moscow Buddhist Center. This significantly increased the flow of tourists to the island. In summer, excursions on the boats are organized and in winter, via automobile transport by ice.

According to representatives of the Siberian Institute of Physiology and Biochemistry of Plants, the increase of tourist flow can be detrimental to flora and fauna of the island.

Pictures

See also
 List of lakes of Russia

References

Landforms of Irkutsk Oblast
Islands of Lake Baikal